Chaine FM was an FM community radio station based in Larne, Northern Ireland. It began broadcasting in December 2007 and had broadcast every December until 2011.  Due to other obligations of key personnel, including working on an application for a full-time community station, it was decided that the station would take a break for Christmas '11.  The station returned 30 November to 24 December 2012, and subsequently it broadcast for the last time from 30 November to 24 December 2013. Chaine FM management had then decided that the station would not return.

On 10 June 2013 Ofcom announced that the station had been granted a full-time Community Radio licence - the station stated that they expected to go on-air in early 2015. Although, in January 2015, Chaine FM confirmed they had stepped back from their plans for a full-time Community Service. Returning the licence they were issued in June 2013 to Ofcom.

Background 
Chaine FM's life spans long before 2007, with the studios being based at the old Radio Moyle site. The station was originally built in 1987, and was run for many years as Radio Moyle, a hospital radio station broadcasting to the wards of the Moyle and Antrim Hospital's. Under the management of Gary Andrews in 2007 the station re-branded as Chaine FM, and was run by a non-for-profit community group - Chaine Music. The station applied for a Restricted Service Licence (RSL) in 2007, and rented accommodation in the Murryfield Shopping Centre in Larne town-centre.

In 2008 - 2013 the station was run from the old Radio Moyle studio at the Moyle Hospital in Larne. Although in 2012 Chaine Music was disbanded, and the new Larne Community Media Ltd was formed, under the leadership of Chairman Stephen Craig.

In 2013, Chaine FM had applied for a RSL licence from Ofcom for the last time, the station broadcast from 30 November 2013, and ceased broadcasting on 24 December 2013. Larne Community Media Ltd directors decided that the station would not be returning.

Larne Community Media Ltd. were successful in gaining an Ofcom Community Radio Licence on 10 June 2013, and the station was expected to go live in early 2015. In January 2015, Larne Community Media, and Chaine FM announced that they were going to take a step back from their plans for a full-time community radio services, and the licence was returned to Ofcom.

It is believed that Chaine FM will never return to the airwaves under current management.

Presenters 2013

Gary Andrews (Chaine FM Breakfast Show with Gary Andrews (Fridays), Saturday Brunch)
Steven Reid (Chaine FM Mid-Mornings)
Noel Hyndman (Chaine FM Breakfast Show (Monday-Thurs))
Stephen Craig (Chaine FM Brunch)
Mark Dobbin (Chaine FM Drive Time)
Mark McWhirter (Chaine FM Brunch, Chaine FM Saturday Brunch)
Pat Thompson (Chaine FM Weekend Afternoons)
Andy Kane (Sunday Brunch)
Len Johnston (Sunday Brunch)
Andy Houston (Chaine FM Drive (Fridays) Chaine FM House Party)
Peter Henderson (Chaine FM Evenings''')
Damien McAtackney (Overnights)
Eammon Pratt (Chaine FM Dance Show)

Warren Boyd (Warren Boyd and Scott Ross)
Scott Ross (Warren Boyd and Scott Ross)
Evan Taylor (The Weekend Warm-Up)
Lisa Crooks (Sunday Night Show Friday Night Request Show)
Stephen Snoddy (Chaine FM Evenings)
Sain Parry (Chaine FM Evenings)
Victoria Hood (Chaine FM Guilty Pleasures)
Steven Armour (Chaine FM Evenings)
Ciara Van Es (Chaine FM Early Mornings)
Gillian Mills (Chaine FM Early Mornings)
Gary Thompson (Chaine FM Evenings)
Chris Armstrong (Chaine FM Weekend Breakfast (Sunday))
Zarak Bartley (Chaine FM Weekend Breakfast (Saturday)'')

External links
 Chaine FM's Official Site
Chaine FM's Android Application
Chaine FM's iPhone Application
Chaine FM's Official Facebook Page

Community radio stations in the United Kingdom
Radio stations in Northern Ireland
Radio stations established in 2007
Larne